In the 10th edition of Systema Naturae, Carl Linnaeus described the Pisces as:
Always inhabiting the waters; are swift in their motion and voracious in their appetites. They breathe by means of gills, which are generally united by a bony arch; swim by means of radiate fins, and are mostly covered over with cartilaginous scales. Besides the parts they have in common with other animals, they are furnished with a nictitant membrane, and most of them with a swim-bladder, by the contraction or dilatation of which, they can raise or sink themselves in their element at pleasure.

Linnaean Characteristics 
Heart: 1 auricle, 1 ventricle. Cold, dark red blood
Gills: external
Jaw: incumbent
Penis: (usually) none
Eggs: without whites
Organs of Sense: tongue, nostrils?, eyes, ears
Covering: imbricate scales
Supports: fins. Swims in the Water & Smacks.

Apodes 

Muraena (eels)
Muraena helena – Mediterranean moray
Muraena ophis – Spotted snake eel
Muraena serpens – Serpent eel
Muraena anguilla – European eel
Muraena myrus – Painted eel
Muraena conger – European conger
Muraena caeca – European finless eel

Gymnotus (electric knifefishes)
Gymnotus carapo – Banded knifefish
Gymnotus asiaticus – Snakehead

Trichiurus (cutlassfishes)
Trichiurus lepturus – Largehead hairtail

Anarhichas (wolffishes)
Anarhichas lupus – Atlantic wolffish

Ammodytes (sand eels)
Ammodytes tobianus – Lesser sand eel

Stromateus (butterfishes)
Stromateus fiatola – Blue Butterfish
Stromateus paru – American Harvestfish

Xiphias (swordfishes)
Xiphias gladius – Swordfish

Jugulares 
Callionymus (dragonets)
Callionymus lyra & Callionymus dracunculus – Common Dragonet
Callionymus indicus – Bartail flathead

Uranoscopus (stargazers)
Uranoscopus scaber – Uranoscopus scaber

Trachinus (weevers)
Trachinus draco – Greater weever

Gadus (cod & kin)
Gadus aeglefinus – Haddock 
Gadus morhua & Gadus callarias – Atlantic Cod
Gadus luscus & Gadus barbatus – Pouting
Gadus minutus – Poor cod
Gadus virens & Gadus carbonarius – Coalfish
Gadus merlangus – Whiting
Gadus pollachius – Pollock
Gadus merluccius – European hake
Gadus molva – Common ling
Gadus lota – Burbot
Gadus mustela – Fivebeard rockling
Gadus mediterraneus – Shore rockling

Blennius (blennies)
Blennius galerita – Montagu's blenny
Blennius cristatus – Molly Miller
Blennius cornutus – Horned blenny
Blennius ocellaris – Butterfly Blenny
Blennius gattorugine – Tompot blenny
Blennius superciliosus – Clinus superciliosus
Blennius mustelarius – nomen dubium
Blennius pholis – Combtooth blenny
Blennius gunnellus – Rock gunnel
Blennius viviparus – Viviparous eelpout 
Blennius lumpenus – unknown
Blennius raninus – Tadpole fish

Ophidion (cusk-wels)
Ophidion barbatum – Snake blenny
Ophidion imberbe – Rock gunnel
Ophidion macrophthalmum – Red bandfish

Thoracici

Cyclopterus 
Cyclopterus (Lumpfishes)
Cyclopterus lumpus – Cyclopterus lumpus
Cyclopterus nudus – Gobiesox nudus

Echeneis 
Echeneis (Remoras)
Echeneis remora – Common remora
Echeneis neucrates – Live sharksucker

Coryphaena 
Coryphaena (Dolphinfishes)
Coryphaena hippurus – Common dolphinfish
Coryphaena equiselis – Pompano dolphinfish
Coryphaena pentadactyla – Fivefinger wrasse 
Coryphaena novacula – Pearly razorfish
Coryphaena pompilus – Rudderfish

Gobius 

Gobius (Gobies)
Gobius niger & Gobius jozo – Black goby 
Gobius paganellus – Rock goby
Gobius eleotris
Gobius aphya
Gobius pectinirostris – Blue-spotted mud hopper
Gobius anguillaris – Taenioides anguillaris

Cottus 
Cottus (Sculpins)
Cottus cataphractus – Agonus cataphractus
Cottus quadricornis – Fourhorn sculpin
Cottus grunniens – Allenbatrachus grunniens
Cottus scaber – Grammoplites scaber
Cottus scorpius – Shorthorn sculpin
Cottus gobio – European bullhead

Scorpaena 
Scorpaena (Scorpionfishes)
Scorpaena porcus – European scorpionfish
Scorpaena scrofa – Bigscale scorpionfish

Zeus 

Zeus (John Dories & kin)
Zeus vomer – Lookdown
Zeus gallus – Selene gallus
Zeus faber – John Dory 
Zeus aper – Capros aper

Pleuronectes 

Pleuronectes (Flatfishes)
Pleuronectes achirus – Achirus achirus
Pleuronectes trichodactylus – Monochirus trichodactylus
Pleuronectes lineatus – Lined sole
Pleuronectes ocellatus – Microchirus ocellatus
Pleuronectes lunatus – Plate fish
Pleuronectes hippoglossus – Atlantic halibut
Pleuronectes cynoglossus – Trobay sole
Pleuronectes platessa – European plaice
Pleuronectes flesus & Pleuronectes passer – European flounder
Pleuronectes limanda – Common dab
Pleuronectes solea – Common sole
Pleuronectes linguatula – Citharus linguatula
Pleuronectes rhombus – Brill
Pleuronectes maximus – Turbot
Pleuronectes papillosus – Syacium papillosum

Chaetodon 

Chaetodon (Butterflyfishes, Angelfishes, & kin)
Chaetodon canescens & Chaetodon cornutus – Moorish idol
Chaetodon argenteus – Silver moony
Chaetodon acuminatus & Chaetodon macrolepidotus – Pennant coralfish
Chaetodon pinnatus – Dusky batfish
Chaetodon punctatus – Drepane punctata
Chaetodon arcuatus – Gray angelfish
Chaetodon rostratus – Copperband butterflyfish
Chaetodon nigricans – Acanthurus nigricans
Chaetodon triostegus – Convict surgeonfish
Chaetodon lineatus – Striped surgeon
Chaetodon striatus – Banded butterflyfish
Chaetodon aruanus – Whitetail dascyllus
Chaetodon capistratus – Foureye butterflyfish
Chaetodon vagabundus – Vagabond butterflyfish
Chaetodon ciliaris – Queen angelfish
Chaetodon saxatilis – Sergeant major
Chaetodon rotundus – Abudefduf septemfasciatus
Chaetodon lanceolatus – Jack-knifefish

Sparus 

Sparus (Breams and Porgies)
Sparus aurata – Gilt-head bream   
Sparus annularis – Diplodus annularis
Sparus sargus – Diplodus sargus
Sparus melanurus – Saddled seabream
Sparus smaris – Spicara smaris
Sparus maena – Spicara maena
Sparus saxatilis – Crenicichla saxatilis
Sparus orphus & Sparus pagrus – Red porgy
Sparus hurta & Sparus mormyrus – Lithognathus mormyrus
Sparus erythrinus – Common pandora
Sparus boops – Boops boops
Sparus cantharus – Black seabream
Sparus chromis – Chromis chromis
Sparus salpa – Salema porgy
Sparus synagris – Lane snapper
Sparus dentex – Common dentex
Sparus spinus – Siganus spinus
Sparus virginicus – Porkfish
Sparus capistratus
Sparus galilaeus – Mango tilapia

Labrus 

Labrus (Wrasses, Parrotfishes, & kin)
Labrus scarus
Labrus cretensis – Mediterranean parrotfish
Labrus anthias – Anthias anthias
Labrus hepatus – Serranus hepatus
Labrus griseus – Mangrove snapper
Labrus lunaris – Moon wrasse
Labrus opercularis – Paradise fish
Labrus pavo – Ornate wrasse
Labrus auritus – Redbreast sunfish
Labrus falcatus – Permit
Labrus rufus – Spanish hogfish
Labrus marginalis
Labrus ferrugineus
Labrus julis & Labrus paroticus – Mediterranean rainbow wrasse
Labrus suillus & Labrus rupestris – Goldsinny wrasse
Labrus striatus – Black sea bass
Labrus gvaza – Venezuelan grouper
Labrus ocellaris
Labrus tinca – Symphodus tinca
Labrus bimaculatus – Cichlasoma bimaculatum
Labrus punctatus – Polycentrus schomburgkii
Labrus melops – Corkwing wrasse
Labrus niloticus – Nile perch
Labrus ossifagus, Labrus mixtus, & Labrus varius – Cuckoo wrasse
Labrus onitis – Tautog
Labrus viridis – Green wrasse
Labrus luscus – Green wrasse
Labrus livens – Labrus merula
Labrus turdus – Labrus viridis
Labrus exoletus & Labrus chinensis – Centrolabrus exoletus
Labrus linearis
Labrus fulvus – Cephalopholis fulva
Labrus radiatus – Puddingwife wrasse
Labrus merula – Brown wrasse
Labrus cynaedus

Sciaena 
Sciaena (Snappers & Croakers)
Sciaena cappa
Sciaena lepisma
Sciaena unimaculata 
Sciaena umbra – Brown meagre
Sciaena cirrosa – Umbrina cirrosa

Perca 

Perca (Perch, Grouper, & kin)
Perca fluviatilis – European perch
Perca lucioperca – Zander (Sander lucioperca)
Perca asper – Asper (Zingel asper)
Perca labrax – European seabass (Dicentrarchus labrax)
Perca nilotica – Nile tilapia (Oreochromis niloticus)
Perca marina – Painted comber (Serranus scriba)
Perca nobilis – Barred grunt (Conodon nobilis)
Perca polymna – Saddleback clownfish (Amphiprion polymnus)
Perca cottoides – Marbled stingfish (Cottapistus cottoides)
Perca philadelphica – Centropristis philadelphica
Perca mediterranea – Axillary wrasse (Symphodus mediterraneus) 
Perca vittata – Oriental Sweetlips (Plectorhinchus vittatus)
Perca punctata – Coney (Cephalopholis fulva)
Perca guttata – Red hind (Epinephelus guttatus)
Perca scriba – Painted comber (Serranus scriba)
Perca venenosa – Yellowfin grouper (Mycteroperca venenosa)
Perca melanura – Cottonwick grunt (Haemulon melanurum)
Perca gibbosa – Pumpkinseed (Lepomis gibbosus)
Perca saltatrix – Kyphosus sectatrix
Perca stigma
Perca diagramma – Striped sweetlips (Plectorhinchus diagrammus)
Perca striata – Striped grunt (Haemulon striatum)
Perca lineata – Yellowbanded sweetlips (Plectorhinchus lineatus)
Perca rhomboidalis – Western Atlantic seabream (Archosargus rhomboidalis)
Perca cernua – Ruffe (Gymnocephalus cernua)
Perca schraetser – Striped ruffe Gymnocephalus schraetser
Perca argentea – Terapon theraps
Perca cabrilla – Comber (Serranus cabrilla)
Perca radula

Gasterosteus 

Gasterosteus (Sticklebacks & kin)
Gasterosteus aculeatus – Three-spined stickleback
Gasterosteus ductor – Pilot fish
Gasterosteus occidentalis
Gasterosteus ovatus – Trachinotus ovatus
Gasterosteus pungitius – Ninespine stickleback
Gasterosteus volitans – Red lionfish
Gasterosteus spinachia – Spinachia spinachia
Gasterosteus spinarella – Flying gurnard

Scomber 

Scomber (Mackerel & Tuna)
Scomber scombrus – Atlantic mackerel
Scomber pelamis – Skipjack tuna
Scomber thynnus – Atlantic bluefin tuna
Scomber cordyla – Torpedo scad
Scomber glaucus – Trachinotus ovatus
Scomber trachurus – Atlantic horse mackerel
Scomber amia – Lichia amia
Scomber pelagicus – Dolphinfish

Mullus 

Mullus (Goatfishes)
Mullus barbatus – Bluntsnouted mullet
Mullus surmuletus – Red mullet
Mullus imberbis – Cardinalfish

Trigla 
Trigla (Sea robins)
Trigla cataphracta – Peristedion cataphractum
Trigla lyra – Piper gurnard
Trigla gurnardus – Grey gurnard
Trigla cuculus – East Atlantic red gurnard
Trigla lucerna – Tub Gurnard
Trigla hirundo – Chelidonichthys gabonensis
Trigla asiatica
Trigla volitans – Flying gurnard

Abdominales 
Cobitis (Loaches)
Cobitis anableps – Four-eyed fish
Cobitis barbatula – Stone loach
Cobitis taenia – Spined loach
Cobitis fossilis – European weatherfish

Silurus (Catfishes)
Silurus asotus – Amur catfish
Silurus glanis – Wels catfish
Silurus aspredo – Aspredo aspredo
Silurus mystus – African Butter catfish
Silurus anguillaris – Mudfish
Silurus batrachus – Walking catfish
Silurus undecimalis
Silurus militaris – Osteogeneiosus militaris
Silurus catus – White catfish
Silurus clarias – Synodontis clarias
Silurus ascita
Silurus costatus – Platydoras costatus
Silurus callichthys – Armored catfish
Silurus cataphractus – Acanthodoras cataphractus

Loricaria (Suckermouth Catfishes)
Loricaria cataphracta – Suckermouth catfish

Salmo (Salmon, Trout, & kin)
Salmo salar – Atlantic salmon
Salmo eriox, Salmo trutta, Salmo fario, & Salmo lacustris – Brown trout
Salmo hucho – Huchen
Salmo carpio – Carpione
Salmo alpinus – Arctic char
Salmo salvelinus, Salmo salmarinus, & Salmo umbla – Salvelinus umbla
Salmo eperlanus – European smelt
Salmo saurus – Atlantic lizardfish
Salmo lavaretus – Common whitefish
Salmo albula & Salmo vimba – Vendace
Salmo thymallus – Grayling
Salmo oxyrinchus – Houting
Salmo gibbosus – Charax gibbosus
Salmo bimaculatus – Astyanax bimaculatus
Salmo immaculatus – Curimata cyprinoides
Salmo niloticus – nomen dubium
Salmo pulverulentus – Acestrorhynchus falcatus
Salmo anostomus – Anostomus anostomus

Fistularia (Cornetfishes)
Fistularia tabacaria – Bluespotted cornetfish

Esox (Pike, Gar, and kin)
Esox sphyraena – European barracuda
Esox osseus – Longnose gar
Esox vulpes – Bonefish
Esox synodus – Diamond lizardfish
Esox lucius – Northern pike
Esox hepsetus – Anchoa hepsetus
Esox bellone
Esox brasiliensis – Ballyhoo
Esox gymnocephalus – unknown

Argentina (Herring smelts)
Argentina sphyraena – European argentine

Atherina (Silversides)
Atherina hepsetus – Mediterranean sand smelt

Mugil (Mullet)
Mugil cephalus – Flathead mullet

Exocoetus (Flying fishes)
Exocoetus volitans – Tropical two-winged flying fish

Polynemus (Threadfins)
Polynemus quinquarius – Pentanemus quinquarius
Polynemus virginicus – Polydactylus virginicusPolynemus paradiseus – Paradise threadfinClupea (Herring, Hatchetfishes, & kin)Clupea harengus – Atlantic herringClupea sprattus – European spratClupea alosa – Allis shadClupea encrasicolus – European anchovyClupea thrissa – Clupanodon thrissaClupea simaClupea sternicla – Common hatchetfishClupea mystus – Coilia mystusClupea tropicaClupea sinensis – Tenualosa reevesiiCyprinus (Carp & kin)Cyprinus barbus – Common barbelCyprinus carpio – Common carpCyprinus gobio – Gobio gobioCyprinus americanus – Menticirrhus americanusCyprinus carassius – Crucian carpCyprinus tinca – TenchCyprinus cephalus – European chubCyprinus auratus – GoldfishCyprinus niloticusCyprinus phoxinus & Cyprinus aphya – Common minnowCyprinus leuciscus, Cyprinus dobula, & Cyprinus grislagine – Common daceCyprinus idbarus, Cyprinus idus, Cyprinus orfus, & Cyprinus jeses – IdeCyprinus rutilus – Common roachCyprinus erythrophthalmus – Common ruddCyprinus nasus – Common NaseCyprinus aspius – AspCyprinus alburnus – Common BleakCyprinus vimba – Vimba breamCyprinus dentex – Alestes dentexCyprinus brama – Carp breamCyprinus cultratus – ZiegeCyprinus bjoerkna – Silver breamCyprinus farenus & Cyprinus ballerus – Blue bream

 Branchiostegi Mormyrus (Elephantfishes)Mormyrus cyprinoides – Marcusenius cyprinoidesMormyrus anguilloides – Cornish jackMormyrus caschive – Mormyrus caschiveBalistes (Triggerfishes)Balistes monoceros – Unicorn leatherjacketBalistes tomentosus – Acreichthys tomentosusBalistes papillosus – Papillose filefishBalistes verrucosus – Rhinecanthus verrucosusBalistes aculeatus – Lagoon triggerfishBalistes vetula – Queen triggerfishBalistes ringens – Xanthichthys ringensBalistes scolopax – Longspine snipefishOstracion (Boxfishes & Cowfishes)Ostracion triqueter – Lactophrys triqueterOstracion trigonus – Lactophrys trigonusOstracion bicaudalis – Spotted trunkfishOstracion tricornis & Ostracion quadricornis – scrawled cowfishOstracion cornutus – longhorn cowfishOstracion tuberculatus & Ostracion cubicus – yellow boxfishOstracion gibbosus – Tetrosomus gibbosusTetraodon (Pufferfishes & Sunfishes)Tetraodon testudineus – Checkered pufferTetraodon lagocephalus – Oceanic pufferTetraodon lineatus – Fahaka pufferfishTetraodon ocellatus – Takifugu ocellatusTetraodon hispidus – White-spotted pufferTetraodon mola – Ocean sunfishDiodon (Porcupinefishes)Diodon atringa – Chilomycterus atringaDiodon reticulatus & Diodon echinatus – Chilomycterus reticulatusDiodon spinosus – Chilomycterus spinosusDiodon hystrix – Spot-fin porcupinefishDiodon holocanthus – Long-spine porcupinefishDiodon raninusCentriscus (Shrimpfishes)Centriscus scutatus – Grooved shrimpfishSyngnathus (Pipefishes & Seahorses)Syngnathus typhle – Broad-nosed pipefishSyngnathus acus – Common pipefishSyngnathus pelagicus – Pelagic pipefishSyngnathus aequoreus – Entelurus aequoreusSyngnathus ophidion & Sygnathus barbarus – Nerophis ophidionSyngnathus hippocampus – Short-snouted seahorsePegasus (Seamoths)Pegasus volitans'' – Longtail seamoth

References 

Systema Naturae
 Systema Naturae, Pisces
Obsolete vertebrate taxa